Aned Y. Muñiz Gracia is a professor and writer.

Background and studies
Aned Muñiz Gracia was born in Corozal, a rural town in Puerto Rico.  She started swimming competitively at age 10 and her first jobs were as a lifeguard and swim instructor.

During her last year of high school, Muñiz Gracia took part in an international cultural exchange program in Austria. She attended the University of Puerto Rico, Río Piedras campus and received a Bachelor of Arts in Modern Languages. During her undergraduate studies, Muñiz Gracia studied one summer at the Far Eastern National University in Vladivostok, Russia, participated in a summer seminar at the Humboldt Universität zu Berlin, and worked at  Fersped Skopje,  an import-export company in Macedonia.

She received the Master of Arts in European Languages and Literature from the University of Hawaii. Professor Aned Muñiz started teaching at the University of Hawaii at age 20. Her Master's Thesis was titled "Music as a Mnemonic and Didactic Device for Language Instruction". Upon completion of her master's degree, Aned Muñiz was awarded a Fulbright grant to conduct research in Austria.

During her second long-term residence in Europe, Aned Muñiz taught at
the  Vienna Business Academies, the  Handelsakademie I and attended the Universities of Vienna and Klagenfurt.
She later moved to California, where she completed her doctorate in Leadership Studies and Educational Sciences at the University of San Diego.  Her dissertation research was about the factors that influence university attendance among high school graduating seniors in Puerto Rico.  She also studied at the Università di Venezia (Cà Foscari) and presented at several academic conferences in the US, Europe and Latin America.

Besides education and sports (she has practiced acrobatics, tandem surfing, swimming, and completed a marathon and several sprint distance triathlons), a big concern of hers is the well-being of Puerto Rico's stray animals.  She has fostered or adopted several Puerto Rican stray dogs.  She also has extensive work with youth as a mentor, swimming instructor, gymnastics judge, as a middle and high school teacher in Austria and at the San Diego German School.  She has also been a summer camp director and children's program supervisor, as well as Assistant Director of the Middlebury College summer language academy.

Having lived, studied or worked in different parts of the world enabled Aned Muñiz Gracia to learn various languages such as Russian, German, French, Spanish, Italian, English. She has also studied Welsh, Serbo-Croatian, and Arabic, among other languages.

Awards and accolades
Aned Muñiz Gracia's roster of scholastic awards includes:

Fulbright award
Outstanding Professor of the Year at MiraCosta College in 2006
Excellence in Teaching Award from Grossmont College in 2007
One of San Diego's "Top 40 under 40" successful young people / community leaders in 2007 by San Diego Metropolitan Magazine 
One of San Diego's "Hispanic Top 10" in 2007 by Nostika magazine
California Language Teachers' Association LangAbroad Award in 2009
Università di Venezia / Italian Government Grant
U.S. Department of State Critical Languages Scholarship
Hawaii Newspaper Agency Award for Excellence in Commentary/Analysis, 1998
German Academic Exchange Service Scholarship
Homecoming Scholar, University of Hawai`i, 1996
Surfer of the Month, El Nuevo Dia newspaper, September 1996
Poetry Award, Association Portoricaine des Professeurs de Français, 1995
Second Prize, University of Hawaii French poetry contest, 1994

Community service
Muñiz Gracia has volunteered as a Latina Youth Mentor with MANA San Diego, the House of Puerto Rico in San Diego, and as a swimming instructor in Austria.  She has helped create or served as Faculty Advisor for various student clubs including the MiraCosta College Italian Club and started her own foundation to create additional educational opportunities in Puerto Rico.

In 2003 Muñiz Gracia spent her summer in Stavanger, Norway, volunteering 40 hours a week for Camp Adventure Youth Services as Camp Director for an international children's day camp.  In the summer of 2009 she led 2 volunteer projects to the Dominican Republic organized by International Student Volunteers and returned to the El Castillo project in 2010. She is serving as Executive Secretary for the House of Puerto Rico in San Diego in 2009 and 2010.

References

Living people
People from Corozal, Puerto Rico
Puerto Rican writers
University of Hawaiʻi alumni
University of Hawaiʻi faculty
University of Puerto Rico alumni
Year of birth missing (living people)